Klock is a Dutch/German surname. It may refer to:

Fort Klock, New York State
Fredrik Klock, a Norwegian footballer
Jacob Klock, Colonel in the Tryon County militia during the American Revolution
James Klock, a Canadian politician

References

Dutch-language surnames
North German surnames